Alford Academy is a secondary school in Alford, Aberdeenshire, Scotland. It is a School of Growth Mindsets.

Alford Academy is a local authority secondary school serving communities from The Lecht to Dunecht.

References

External links
School website

Secondary schools in Aberdeenshire